Samukh (formerly known as Nəbiağalı (1992–2008)) (also, Sabarkend, Sabir, Safarabad, Safaraliyeb, and Safaraliyev) is a city and the most populous municipality in, and the administrative center of, the Samukh District of Azerbaijan. It has a population of 6,013.

References 

Populated places in Samukh District